STLB or sTLB may refer to:

 Second-level or shared translation lookaside buffer (sTLB), introduced in the Intel Nehalem microarchitecture
 St. Louis Blues, an ice hockey team in St. Louis, Missouri, US

See also
 St. Louis, Brownsville and Mexico Railway (STLB&M), a defunct American railway in Texas, US